Merab Jordania (born 3 September 1965), is a Georgian former professional footballer who played as a midfielder. He is the owner and chairman of Maltese football club Valletta FC.

Club career
Jordania was born in Tbilisi. During his career he played for Dinamo Tbilisi (1980–81, 1984–87), Torpedo Kutaisi (1982–1983) and FC Guria Lanchkhuti (1988–90).

Managerial and presidential career
Later, in 1998-2005 he was the president of Georgian Football Federation. In 2003, he was one of the temporary managers of Georgia national football team.

Vitesse Arnhem
In August 2010, he bought financially troubled Vitesse Arnhem. There were rumors that this purchase was engineered by Chelsea owner Roman Abramovich. He followed-up by acquiring the services of new players and replacing manager Theo Bos with the inexperienced Albert Ferrer, a former Spanish international defender. In 2013, Jordania appointed Peter Bosz, who left the club in January 2015. In 2016, Henk Fraser was appointed manager of the Vitesse first team.

References

External links
Official Web-site

1965 births
Living people
Mingrelians
Sports executives and administrators
Footballers from Georgia (country)
Soviet footballers
Association football midfielders
FC Dinamo Tbilisi players
FC Guria Lanchkhuti players
Stjarnan players
Georgia national football team managers
Football managers from Georgia (country)
Honoured Masters of Sport of the USSR